John Henry Drury (born 23 May 1936) is an Anglican priest and author. He has been the Chaplain of All Souls College, Oxford, since 2003.

Early life and education
Drury was born on 23 May 1936. He was educated at Bradfield and Trinity Hall, Cambridge.

Ordained ministry
Drury was ordained in 1963. His first post was a curacy at St John's Wood. Later he was Chaplain of Downing College, Cambridge, then fellow of Exeter College, Oxford. From 1973 to 1979 he was a Residentiary Canon at Norwich Cathedral and after that Head of Religious Studies at Sussex University. From 1981 to 1991 he was Dean of King's College, Cambridge. That year he became Dean of Christ Church, Oxford, a post he held for 12 years. He has been Chaplain of All Souls College, Oxford, since 2003.

Honours
He has been awarded a Doctor of Divinity (DD) Lambeth degree.

Selected works
Drury is a noted author.

 Angels and Dirt, 1972
 Luke, 1973
 Tradition and Design in Luke's Gospel, 1976
 The Pot and The Knife, 1979
 The Parables in the Gospels, 1985
 Critics of the Bible 1724–1873, 1989
 The Burning Bush, 1990
 Painting the Word, 1999
 Music at Midnight: the Life and Poetry of George Herbert, 2013

References

Fellows of King's College, Cambridge
Deans of Christ Church, Oxford
Fellows of All Souls College, Oxford
Holders of a Lambeth degree
People educated at Bradfield College
Alumni of Trinity Hall, Cambridge
Fellows of Exeter College, Oxford
1936 births
Living people